Miss India Worldwide 1994 was the fourth edition of the international female pageant. The final was held in New York City, New York, United States on  July 30, 1994. Total number of contestants were not known. Karminder Kaur Virk  of India crowned as winner at the end of the event.

Results

Delegates
 – Gita Bali
 – Karminder Kaur Virk
 – Dennis Dass
 – Ratna Kancherla

External links
http://www.worldwidepageants.com/

References

1994 beauty pageants
1994 in New York City